Swimming pool cleaner refers to:
Swimming pool sanitation
Swimming pool service technician